Shannon Crawford (born September 12, 1963 in Guelph, Ontario) is a Canadian rower. She won a gold medal at the 1992 Summer Olympics in Barcelona, in coxed eight.

References

External links

1963 births
Living people
Sportspeople from Guelph
Canadian female rowers
Olympic rowers of Canada
Olympic gold medalists for Canada
Rowers at the 1992 Summer Olympics
Olympic medalists in rowing
Medalists at the 1992 Summer Olympics
Pan American Games medalists in rowing
Pan American Games silver medalists for Canada
Pan American Games gold medalists for Canada
Rowers at the 1991 Pan American Games
20th-century Canadian women